Andy or Andrew Hunt may refer to:

Andy Hunt (author), author and publisher of books on software
Andy Hunt (footballer) (born 1970), former English football player
Andrew Hunt (historian) (born 1968), history professor at the University of Waterloo
Andrew Hunt (painter) (1790–1861), landscape-painter
Andrew Murray Hunt, engineer who served on the Naval Consulting Board